Józef Mirosław Życiński (1 September 1948 – 10 February 2011) was a Polish philosopher, publicist, the Roman Catholic Metropolitan Archbishop of the Archdiocese of Lublin and a Professor of the Pontifical Academy of Theology in Rome, Pontifical University of John Paul II in Cracow and Catholic University of Lublin.

Życiński was born in Nowa Wieś. Between 1990 and 1997 he was the Bishop of the Diocese of Tarnów. He died in Rome.

Życiński's notable published works include W kręgu nauki i wiary, Dylematy ewolucji, and Bóg Abrahama i Whiteheada.

See also
Catholic Church in Poland

References

 

1948 births
2011 deaths
20th-century Roman Catholic archbishops in Poland
21st-century Roman Catholic archbishops in Poland
Cardinal Stefan Wyszyński University in Warsaw alumni
Pontifical University of John Paul II alumni
20th-century Polish philosophers
21st-century Polish philosophers
Polish publicists
People from Piotrków County
Members of the European Academy of Sciences and Arts